The Khaju Bridge is one of the historical bridges on the Zayanderud, the largest river of the Iranian Plateau, in Isfahan, Iran. Serving as both a bridge and a weir, it links the Khaju quarter on the north bank with the Zoroastrian quarter across the Zayanderud. It is located at the end of Kamal Ismail Street in Isfahan.

The bridge served a primary function as a building and a place for public meetings in the past. It has been described as the city's finest bridge.

Persian art historians and revivalists, Arthur Upham Pope and Phyllis Ackerman are interred in a mausoleum nearby.

History
The Khaju Bridge was built around 1650, under the reign of Abbas II, the seventh Safavid king (shah) of Iran, on the foundations of an older bridge. The existing inscriptions suggest that the bridge was repaired in 1873. There is a pavilion located in the center of the structure, inside which Abbas II would have once sat, admiring the view. Today, remnants of a stone seat is all that is left of the king's chair.

In words of Arthur Pope and Jean Chardin, Khaju is "the culminating monument of Persian bridge architecture and one of the most interesting bridges extant ... where the whole has rhythm and dignity and combines in the happiest consistency, utility, beauty, and recreation."
The poets of Isfahan wrote beautiful poems on the Khajoo bridge and in these poems they praised its beauties. Among these poems is the long poem by Saeb Tabrizi which describes one of the days of celebration and illumination next to this bridge. According to historians and scholars who have studied the Safavid dynasty, Shah Abbas II's goal in building the Khajoo Bridge was to connect the two districts of Khajoo and the Hassanabad Gate with Takht-e Folad and Shiraz Road. Tourists who came to Isfahan at different times praised the beauty of the Khajoo Bridge and considered it one of the eternal masterpieces of Iranian and Islamic architecture.

Structure
The bridge has 23 arches and is 133 meters long and 12 meters wide. It was originally decorated with tilework and paintings and served as a teahouse. The passway of the bridge is made of bricks and stones with 21 larger and 26 smaller inlet and outlet channels and is 7.5 meters wide. The pieces of stone used in the bridge are over 2 meters long, and the distance between every channel and the ceiling base is 21 meters.

There are several sluice gates under the archways, through which the water flow of the Zayanderud is regulated. When the sluice gates are closed, the water level behind the bridge is raised to facilitate the irrigation of the many gardens along the river upstream of the bridge. On the upper level of the bridge, the main central aisle was utilized by horses and carts and the vaulted paths on either side by pedestrians. Octagonal pavilions in the center of the bridge on both the down and the upstream sides provide vantage points for the remarkable views. The lower level of the bridge may be accessed by pedestrians and remains a popular shady place for relaxing.

Iranian architects have raised concerns about damage inflicted on the bridge during recent "improvement program" renovations, citing, among other problems, the destruction of the original stepped base of the bridge, the alterations made to the riverbed, and the removal of the Safavid inscribed stone blocks from the bridge.

Gallery

See also
 Si-o-se-pol, another such bridge on the same river
 Putra Bridge, a bridge in Malaysia that was inspired by Khaju

References

Further reading

External links

Tourist attractions in Isfahan
Bridges in Isfahan
Bridges in Iran
Bridges completed in the 17th century
Buildings and structures completed in 1650
1650 establishments in Iran
Safavid architecture